Jules Sitruk (born April 16, 1990 in Lilas, near Paris) is a French actor, most widely known for his roles in the 2002 Jugnot film Monsieur Batignole and the 2007 Hammer & Tongs film Son of Rambow.

Sitruk began acting at the age of 8, after being cast at his hairdressers. His first feature film was  Monsieur Batignole (2001) with Gérard Jugnot, who acknowledged his talent amongst other young French actors at the time. Other films include Moi César (2003), Vipère au poing (2004) and Les Aiguilles rouges (2005).

Sitruk is also one of the three narrators in the original first-person version of March of the Penguins.  His first English-language film was Son of Rambow, filmed in London in 2006.

In 2018, he starred in Garth Davis’s historic film Marie Madeleine.

Personal life
Sitruk is Jewish. He is related to the comedian Olivier Sitruk. Jules has studied Literature Baccalaureate at the Lycée Général of Paris, after completing his time at the Young School of Acting.

Filmography

Awards
Sitruk has won the Best Actor ifab Award at the 2015 International Film Awards Berlin

References

External links

1990 births
Living people
People from Les Lilas
Jewish French male actors
French male child actors
French male film actors